Roger Pirotte (born 31 March 1910, date of death unknown) was a Belgian cyclist. He competed in the tandem event at the 1936 Summer Olympics.

References

External links
 

1910 births
Year of death missing
Belgian male cyclists
Olympic cyclists of Belgium
Cyclists at the 1936 Summer Olympics
Place of birth missing